John Archer (10 August 1921 – 29 July 1997) was an English athlete who competed mainly in the 100 metres. He was born in Nottingham.

He won the European Athletics championships 1946 Oslo men's 100 m with a consistent time of 10.6 seconds through the heats and in the final. He competed for Great Britain in the Athletics at the 1948 Summer Olympics – men's 4 × 100 metres relay held in London, Great Britain where he won the silver medal with his teammates John Gregory, Alastair McCorquodale and Kenneth Jones. The British team were initially awarded the gold medal after the US team were disqualified for a faulty baton change but, two days later, following a review, they had to hand the gold medals back and were awarded the silver medal in a second ceremony.
He represented England and won a silver medal in the 4×110 yd relay at the 1950 British Empire Games in Auckland, New Zealand.

Archer died in Cheltenham, Gloucestershire.

References

 

1921 births
1997 deaths
Sportspeople from Nottingham
English male sprinters
British male sprinters
Olympic athletes of Great Britain
Olympic silver medallists for Great Britain
Athletes (track and field) at the 1948 Summer Olympics
English Olympic medallists
Commonwealth Games medallists in athletics
Commonwealth Games silver medallists for England
Athletes (track and field) at the 1950 British Empire Games
European Athletics Championships medalists
Medalists at the 1948 Summer Olympics
Olympic silver medalists in athletics (track and field)
Medallists at the 1950 British Empire Games